This is a list of clocks that have attained notability because of their historical importance, accuracy, exceptional artistry, architectural value, or size.

Africa

Morocco 
 Dar al-Magana, water clock completed in 1357
 Dar al-Muwaqqit, water clock completed in 1361

Asia

Indonesia 
 Jam Gadang, clock tower in the city of Bukittinggi, West Sumatra, Indonesia

Israel 
 Eretz Yisrael Clock

Japan 
 Cosmo Clock 21, the world's largest clock

Malaysia 
 Malay College Kuala Kangsar clock tower
 Sultan Abdul Samad Building
 Jubilee Clock Tower

Singapore 
 The Chinese High School Clock Tower Building
 Victoria Theatre and Concert Hall

Sri Lanka 
 Old Colombo Lighthouse
 Khan Clock Tower
 Koch Memorial Clock Tower

Yemen 
 Big Ben Aden

Europe

Czech Republic 
 Prague astronomical clock
 Brno astronomical clock
 Olomouc astronomical clock

Denmark 
 Jens Olsen's World Clock

Belarus 
 Old and very rare pendulum clock on St. Francis Xavier Cathedral in Hrodna. Earlier, the clock was located on the town hall tower.

England/Wales 
 Big Ben, London, is England's most famous clock, and arguably the World's. 'Big Ben' is the name of the bell, rather than the clock itself, but most people associate the name with the clock, which is officially known as the 'Great Westminster Clock'.
 The Eastgate Clock, Chester is one of the most photographed clocks in England outside London.
 The Royal Liver Building Clock, Liverpool is Britain's largest clock face, and the largest electronically driven clocks in the UK.
 Salisbury Cathedral clock displays a model of the universe in miniature. The mechanism, dated at 1392 and still working, is in London's Science Museum.
 The Corpus Clock, Corpus Christi College, Cambridge is a 2008 public clock of novel design.
 The Liberty Clock Constructed by Liberty of London along with the Great Marlborough Street store in 1925.
 The lighting installation at Oriel Plas Glyn y Weddw in Llanbedrog North Wales now has the largest clock. The cafe dome designed by Matthew Saunderson features 12 evenly spaced columns & arches. LED lighting either side of the arches flash on the hour to indicate the corresponding time. The cafe floor is approximately 10m (33feet) in diameter. The lighting and subsequent programming was completed by Jason Jos Electrical and 3-e Smart Control.

France
 The Strasbourg astronomical clock in the cathedral, completed in 1842, is one of the most complicated mechanical clocks ever made.

Germany 
 In Esslingen, Germany, at the headquarters of Festo, Professor Hans Scheurenbrand has constructed the Harmonices Mundi, an astronomical clock, a world time clock, and a 74 bell glockenspiel.
 The Alexanderplatz in Berlin contains the World Time clock.
 "Die Pyramide" (German article) a skyscraper in Berlin, has what is claimed as the largest clock in Europe. It is a digital clock, with 10 metre high digits.
 The Rathaus-Glockenspiel (1908), an ornate clock located in Munich's Marienplatz, has almost life-sized moving figures that show scenes from a medieval jousting tournament as well as a performance of the Schäfflertanz ("Barrel-makers' dance").

Isle of Man 
 The Jubilee clock is a street clock in the Isle of Man capital of Douglas built in 1887 as commemoration of the Golden Jubilee of Queen Victoria's reign.

Italy 
 St Mark's Clock Venice

Poland 
 Collegium Maius Clock, Krakow. Near the portal, on the wall, there is a clock that plays at 9:00, 11:00, 13:00, 15:00 and 17:00 the song of Jan from Lublin from the 16th century and the academic song Gaudeamus igitur. Later, the signal comes out of the figures, depicted six figures: pedal of the Jagiellonian University, queen Jadwiga, king Władysław Jagiełło, Jan from Kęt, Hugo Kołłątaj and Stanisław from Skarbimierz. This clock is the fourth in turn and was launched in 2000.
 Town Hall Clock Tower, Poznan. Poznań Goats is one of the tourist attractions of Poznań. The mechanical goats' butting display takes place every day at 12:00 on the tower of the Poznań City Hall.

Russia
 Raketa Monumental the world's biggest mechanical clock movement, installed in the great atrium of the Detsky mir shop on Lubyanka Square in Moscow.
 Kremlin Clock, Moscow

Switzerland 
 Zytglogge tower, Bern; a medieval clock tower.

North America

Canada 
 Peace Tower, Ottawa

Honduras 

 Clock of the Cathedral Immaculate cocneption, in Comayagua.

United States 
 Clock of the Long Now, Colorado
 Colgate Clock, New Jersey
 The Dreger Clock, Buena Park, California is an electrically driven and regulated multi-face town clock, created in Long Beach, CA, it spent 50 years at Knott's Berry Farm and is undergoing restoration by the Buena Park Historical Society
 Jessop's Clock, San Diego, California, is a pendulum regulated multi-face town clock commissioned in 1905 by Joseph Jessop, a jewellery store owner in San Diego, California.
 The Ohio Clock is an 1815 clock in the United States Capitol
 The Town Clock of Dubuque, Iowa is in a downtown clock tower, built in 1864.
 The Clock of the Nations, Rochester, New York was located at the Midtown Plaza in the 1960s. It had dioramas of 12 different nations. Every hour on the hour the dioramas opened up and music was played. The clock is now located at the Rochester Airport.
 The oldest continuously running clock in the United States is located in Winnsboro, South Carolina, and dates all the way back to 1837.
Hertzberg Clock (San Antonio), Texas
Department of Defense master clock, at United States Naval Observatory, Washington, D.C.
Delacorte Clock, Central Park, New York City
Baxter Clock, New Bern, North Carolina, NRHP-listed
Copake Memorial Clock, Copake, NY, NRHP-listed
Old Clock at Zion's First National Bank, Salt Lake City, UT, NRHP-listed
The digital countdown clock at the Press Site-Clock and Flag Pole, Kennedy Space Center, Florida, NRHP-listed
Sidewalk Clock at 161-11 Jamaica Avenue, New York, NY, NRHP-listed
Sidewalk Clock at 200 5th Avenue, Manhattan, New York, NY, NRHP-listed
Sidewalk Clock at 519 3rd Avenue, Manhattan, New York, NY, NRHP-listed
Sidewalk Clock at 522 5th Avenue, Manhattan, New York, NY, NRHP-listed
Sidewalk Clock at 783 5th Avenue, Manhattan, New York, NY, in front of The Sherry-Netherland, NRHP-listed
Sidewalk Clock at 1501 3rd Avenue, Manhattan, New York, NY, NRHP-listed
Snow Fountain and Clock, Brockton, Massachusetts, NRHP-listed
Shot Clock Monument, Syracuse, New York

Oceania

Australia 
 Nylex Clock, Cremorne, Victoria
 Royal Clock, Queen Victoria Building, Sydney

Other 
 The Doomsday Clock by Bulletin of the Atomic Scientists, which symbolizes man's current risk of nuclear war
 Experimental Talking Clock, long thought to be the world's oldest playable sound recording

See also 
 List of largest clock faces
 List of largest cuckoo clocks
 List of clock towers
 List of tallest clock towers

References